The General Tire 150 was a 150-mile (240 km) ARCA Menards Series race held at the Kentucky Speedway. 

The track hosted the series twice a year between 2000 and 2009 (except 2003), with this race being held in July as a supporting race to the NASCAR Truck Series. The other race at the track was held as a standalone race in May, except for its first year in 2000 when it was held in August.

The ARCA Series would return to the track in September 2013. After five years, it was removed from the schedule again after the 2017 season when its supporting race, the NASCAR Xfinity Series VisitMyrtleBeach.com 300 was also removed. The race was re-added in 2020 as a result of the COVID-19 schedule changes resulting in the Charlotte Motor Speedway race being cancelled.

List of winners

 2013 and 2015: The race was postponed a day because of rain.
 2006 and 2016: Race extended due to green-white-checker finish.

References

External links 
 Racing-Reference.info – Kentucky Speedway

2000 establishments in Kentucky
ARCA Menards Series races
Motorsport in Kentucky
Recurring sporting events established in 2000
Recurring_sporting_events_disestablished_in_2020